Soğanlı is a village in the Sur District of Diyarbakır Province in Turkey.

References

Villages in Sur District